Austroclitocybe is a genus of fungi in the family Tricholomataceae. The genus is monotypic, containing the single species Austroclitocybe veronicae, found in temperate South America. The genus was circumscribed by Jörg H. Raithelhuber in 1972.

See also

 List of Tricholomataceae genera

References

External links
 

Tricholomataceae
Monotypic Agaricales genera
Fungi of South America